Isabella River may refer to:

Isabella River (Minnesota), USA, a tributary of South Kawishiwi River
Isabella River (New South Wales), Australia, a tributary of Abercrombie River

See also 
 Isabella (disambiguation)
 Little Isabella River